The men's flyweight event was part of the boxing programme at the 1976 Summer Olympics. The weight class allowed boxers of up to 51 kilograms to compete. The competition was held from 18 to 31 July 1976. 26 boxers from 26 nations competed.

Medalists

Results
The following boxers took part in the event:

First round
 Jung Chul-Kim (KOR) def. Somchai Putapibarn (THA), 5:0
 Said Ahmed El-Ashry (EGY) def. Sandor Orbán (HUN), 5:0
 Alfredo Pérez (VEN) def. Ernesto Rios (MEX), 5:0

Second round
 Toshinori Koga (JPN) def. Virgilio Palomo (COL), walk-over
 Ramón Duvalón (CUB) def. Souley Hancaradu (NIG), walk-over
 Ian Clyde (CAN) def. Alick Chiteule (ZAM), walk-over
 Charlie Magri (GBR) def. Eric Quaotsey (GHA), walk-over
 Vicente Rodríguez (ESP) def. Mbarek Zarrougui (MAR), RSC-2
 Jong Jo-Ung (PRK) def. Joachim Schür (FRG), RSC-2
 Giovanni Camputaro (ITA) def. Mohammad Sadiq (PAK), 5:0
 David Torosyan (URS) def. Hassen Sheriff (ETH), walk-over
 Agustín Martínez (NIC) def. Adroni Butambeki (UGA), walk-over
 David Larmour (IRL) def. Robert Musuku (SUA), walk-over
 Leo Randolph (USA) def. Massoudi Samatou (TOG), walk-over
 Constantin Gruescu (ROM) def. Douglas Maina (KEN), walk-over
 Leszek Błażyński (POL) def. Antonio Filho (BRA), KO-2
 Fazlija Šaćirović (YUG) def. Julio Guzmán (PUR), 5:0
 Alfredo Pérez (VEN) def. Said Ahmed El-Ashry (EGY), walk-over
 Georgi Kostadinov (BUL) def. Jung Chul-Kim (KOR), 5:0

Third round
 Ramón Duvalón (CUB) def. Toshinori Koga (JPN), 5:0
 Ian Clyde (CAN) def. Charlie Magri (GBR), KO-3
 Jong Jo-Ung (PRK) def. Vicente Rodríguez (ESP), 3:2
 David Torosyan (URS) def. Giovanni Camputaro (ITA), RSC-2
 David Larmour (IRL) def. Agustin Martínez (NIC), walk-over
 Leo Randolph (USA) def. Constantin Gruescu (ROM), 4:1
 Leszek Błażyński (POL) def. Fazlija Sacirović (YUG), 3:2
 Alfredo Pérez (VEN) def. Georgi Kostadinov (BUL), 5:0

Quarterfinals
 Ramón Duvalón (CUB) def. Ian Clyde (CAN), 5:0
 David Torosyan (URS) def. Jong Jo-Ung (PRK), 5:0
 Leo Randolph (USA) def. David Larmour (IRL), 4:1
 Leszek Błażyński (POL) def. Alfredo Pérez (VEN), 3:2

Semifinals
 Ramón Duvalón (CUB) def. David Torosyan (URS), DSQ-2
 Leo Randolph (USA) def. Leszek Błażyński (POL), 4:1

Final
 Leo Randolph (USA) def. Ramón Duvalón (CUB), 3:2

References

Flyweight